Aidos amanda is a moth of the Aididae family. It is found in Suriname, Brazil Venezuela and the Guianas.

The larvae feed on the leaves of Annona punicifolia. The larva has seven or eight instars.

References

Moths described in 1782
Zygaenoidea